Carol Henry (born 1960) is an American fine art photographer and curator.

Life 

Carol Henry (photographer) (born November 1960), American fine arts photographer
Carol A. Henry was born in the Ohio city of Hamilton. Since 1985, she has lived in California and resides in Carmel.

Photography 
In creating her photographic work, she does not use a camera; her photographic work is created in a darkroom directly on Ilfochrome (formerly Cibachrome) paper. Known for her botanical imagery, she projects the light through her subjects onto the positive receiving Ilfochrome color photographic paper, creating one-of-a-kind images. Her images are made with transmitted light, creating clarity and saturation. She worked with this experimental process for more than 20 years. Because of her unique process of directing light through her subject-matter, The San Francisco Chronicle named Carol Henry as one of the 100 reasons to visit Carmel, CA during Carmel's 100 year anniversary celebration, calling her botanical photography "...erotic, vibrant, bold and delicate at the same time" 

Carol Henry has explored more camera-less photographic techniques since 2012 when Ilfochrome paper ceased to be manufactured. The cyanotype process, from the mid 1800s has been embraced by Carol Henry to continue her exploration of natural subjects and the human narrative using light and form.

Curatorial Work

She Loves Me, She Loves Me Not 
In 2016, Carol Henry spent a full year researching and gathering work by 12 renowned women photographers with the male as subject, to form the exhibition, She Loves Me, She Loves Me Not. The exhibition celebrates a hundred years of successful women in the medium and reveals a less than exhibited photo topic! She Loves Me, She Loves Me Not features 12 of the most renowned women in photography showing images of men in their work. The exhibit opens with silver gelatin photographs by Imogen Cunningham, who was called an “immoral woman” for exhibiting nude fine-art photographs of her own husband. Other women included in the exhibit are Edna Bullock, Martha Casanave, Jodi Cobb, Judy Dater, Flor Garduño, Dorothea Lange, Sally Mann, Mary Ellen Mark, Holly Roberts, Adrienne Salinger, Joyce Tenneson and Henry herself. The exhibition opened in January 2017 at the Center for Photographic Art   and went on to The Florida Museum of Photographic Art in June 2017. The final venue for the exhibit was Post Ranch Inn, Big Sur, CA October 2017.

Bill Owens | The American Dream
March 2019. Carmel Visual Arts, Carmel, CA

Wynn Bullock
July 2018, The Post Gallery

Kathryn Mayo | We Are Selma 
June 2018. Carmel Visual Arts, Carmel, CA

William Giles & The Elementalists 
March 2017. Carmel Visual Arts, Carmel, CA.

Jeff Nixon | Black and White Photography 
January 2016. Carmel Visual Arts, Carmel, CA.

Tom Millea 
January 2014. Carmel Visual Arts, Carmel, CA.

References

Living people
American photographers
American women photographers
1960 births
Date of birth missing (living people)
21st-century American women